Ragnar Kjartansson may refer to:

 Ragnar Kjartansson (sculptor) (1923–1989), Icelandic sculptor
 Ragnar Kjartansson (performance artist) (born 1976), Icelandic performance artist